Fútbol de Primera was an Argentine TV program that broadcast the football matches of the Argentine Primera División. It was produced by Torneos y Competencias. It began on ATC in 1985, moved to Canal 9 in 1992, and then was broadcast Eltrece up to 2009, when it was cancelled as a result of the cancellation of the contract between the Argentine Football Association and TyC and the creation of Fútbol para todos. The program received the Golden Martín Fierro award.

History

References

Golden Martín Fierro Award winners
Sports television in Argentina
1985 Argentine television series debuts
2009 Argentine television series endings
El Trece original programming
El Nueve original programming
Televisión Pública original programming